Tami Steinmetz Center For Peace Research was an academic research institution of Tel Aviv University was founded in 1992 and closed down in 2020 as the subject of peace was considered no longer relevant. The center was funded by Daniela and Daniel Steinmetz, who established it in memory of their daughter. It surveyed public opinion regarding the Israeli–Palestinian peace process, the Israeli–Palestinian conflict, and the Arab–Israeli conflict.

The center published monthly surveys about the current state of public opinion. It was most famous for the "Peace Index", a numerical measure of Israeli public support for the peace process. The Peace Index was divided into 4 sub-indices:
 General Peace Index
 Oslo Index
 Syrian Index
 Negotiation Index

Each index was computed according to the number and percent of supporters for each peace negotiation and the number of people believing that the negotiation will actually achieve peace.

See also
 Al Mezan Center for Human Rights
 American Israel Public Affairs Committee
 Amnesty International
 Human Rights Watch
 Madrid Conference of 1991
 Oslo Accords (1993)
 Israel–Jordan peace treaty (1994)
 Camp David 2000 Summit
 Projects working for peace among Israelis and Arabs
 List of Middle East peace proposals
 International law and the Arab–Israeli conflict

References

External links
 Official website

Tel Aviv University
Non-governmental organizations involved in the Israeli–Palestinian peace process